Harpford is a small village in East Devon, England.  It lies on the east side of the River Otter, less than 1 mile north east of the larger village of Newton Poppleford.

Harpford was an ancient parish.  The parish was a strip parish, which included Harpford Hill and Harpford Common some 1.5 miles west of the village, and another area of Harpford Common 1.5 miles east of the village.    Harpford became a civil parish in 1866, and in 1935 the parish was enlarged by the addition of the more populous parish of Newton Poppleford and the smaller parish of Venn Ottery.  In 1968 the parish was renamed Newton Poppleford and Harpford.

St Gregory's Church was mentioned in 1205, although the earliest part of the fabric of the present church is dated to the 14th century.  It is a Grade II* listed building.

The East Devon Way path passes through the village, and through Harpford Woods east of the village.

References

External links

Villages in Devon
Former civil parishes in Devon
East Devon District